Qarah Vanlu (also Romanized as Qarah Vānlū; also known as Qarah Bāghlū and Qareh Dāghlū) is a village in Qeshlaq Rural District, Abish Ahmad District, Kaleybar County, East Azerbaijan Province, Iran. At the 2006 census, its population was 561, in 128 families.

References 

Populated places in Kaleybar County